Nanny Matilda Hammarström (March 23, 1870 – December 3, 1953) was a Finland-Swedish teacher and author. 

Hammarström was born in Vaasa. She taught mathematics, natural history, and geography at schools in Kokkola (1890–1891), Mariehamn (1895–1900), and Loviisa (1900–1943). She was active in a variety of roles in the community and society in Loviisa; she was a member of the town council from 1919 to 1923, and she became the chair of the town library board in 1930.

Hammarström was known in particular as an author of children's books with nature themes. Her eleven books of stories were published in large print runs. She gained an international foothold with her debut work  (The Adventures of Two Ants, 1906); the book was translated into Finnish, Norwegian, German, English, and Russian. Her books are about the life and interaction of nature and animals, and Hammarström illustrated them herself. The books  (Children and Adults I–II, published in 1918 and 1920), are about the author's own family.

Hammarström died in Loviisa, where she is also buried.

References

1870 births
1953 deaths
Finnish children's writers
Finnish women children's writers
Swedish-language writers
Finnish educators
Swedish-speaking Finns
People from Vaasa